Two submarines of the French Navy have borne the name Curie in honour of Pierre and Marie Curie.

 , a submarine of the Brumaire class; laid down on 18 July 1912; served in the First World War.  She was scrapped in 1923.
 , the former HMS Vox, a U-class submarine of the Royal Navy transferred to the Free French Navy in World War II in 1943; returned to the British in 1946; scrapped in 1949

French Navy ship names